Jorge Edson Souza de Brito (born October 13, 1966), known as Jorge Edson, is a retired volleyball player from Brazil. He was a member of the Brazil men's national volleyball team that won the gold medal at the 1992 Summer Olympics in Barcelona, Spain by defeating The Netherlands (3-0) in the final. He played as a middle blocker. He was born in Porto Alegre.

Coaching career
Edson later became a coach. From 2002 onwards, Edson led top-tier Brazilian clubs and clinched podium finishes for sides from Turkey and Japan. He was part of the coaching staff of the Incheon Korean Air Jumbos of the South Korean V-League from 2015 to 2016 and the Clube Duque de Caxais in 2021.

He was a remote assistant coach of the Brazil women's national team which won gold at the 2008 Summer Olympics in Beijing, China.

Edson joined the coaching staff of the Philippines women's national team in July 2021 under the FIVB's development project platform. He joined the Philippine national team as a consultant with Arthur Mamon remaining head coach of the team. When the national team was fielded as two club sides (Rebisco and Choco Mucho) in the 2021 Asian Women's Club Volleyball Championship, Edson was tasked to be the head coach of the Rebisco team, and Mamon was tasked to lead the Choco Mucho team.

Personal life
He is married to Raquele Lenartowicz, a former professional volleyball player, with whom he has three children. He is also Roman Catholic.

References

Brazilian men's volleyball players
Volleyball players at the 1992 Summer Olympics
Olympic volleyball players of Brazil
Olympic gold medalists for Brazil
1966 births
Living people
Place of birth missing (living people)
Olympic medalists in volleyball
Medalists at the 1992 Summer Olympics
Brazilian volleyball coaches
Brazilian expatriates in Japan
Brazilian expatriates in South Korea
Sportspeople from Porto Alegre
Pan American Games medalists in volleyball
Pan American Games silver medalists for Brazil
Medalists at the 1991 Pan American Games